Kamal Aboki (born January 1, 1992) was a Nigerian comedian and a skit maker, He acted in many Hausa comedies.

Early life and education
Aboki was born in Kawo of Nassarawa Local Government Area of Kano. At the time of death, he had 96.3K followers on Instagram and had posted 665 times.

He also has his own YouTube channel with around 139K subscribers.

Death
Aboki died in a bus accident on January 16, 2023.

References

1997 births
2023 deaths
Nigerian male film actors
People from Kano
Male actors in Hausa cinema
21st-century Nigerian male actors
Kannywood actors
Nigerian comedians
Hausa people